Posadowsky Glacier may refer to:
Posadowsky Glacier (Antarctica)
Posadowsky Glacier (Bouvet Island)